Scopula sybillaria is a moth of the family Geometridae first described by Charles Swinhoe in 1902. It is found in western China, Hong Kong and possibly Borneo.

Adults are greyish fawn in colour.

References

Moths described in 1902
sybillaria
Moths of Asia